Pierce or Piers Butler may refer to:
Piers Butler, 8th Earl of Ormond (c. 1467 – 26 August 1539), Anglo-Irish nobleman in the Peerage of Ireland
Piers Butler, 3rd Viscount Galmoye (1652–1740), Anglo-Irish nobleman in the Peerage of Ireland
Pierce Butler, 4th Viscount Ikerrin (c. 1677–1711), Irish peer, politician and soldier
Sir Pierce Butler, 4th Baronet (1670–1732), Irish Member of Parliament in the Irish House of Commons for Carlow County
Pierce Butler (American politician) (1744–1822), U.S. Senator and Founding Father from South Carolina
Pierce Butler (Kilkenny MP, born 1774) (1774–1846), Irish Member of Parliament in the United Kingdom House of Commons for Kilkenny
Pierce Mason Butler (1798–1847), American soldier and politician, Governor of South Carolina
Pierce Mease Butler (died 1867), American plantation owner, husband of actress Fanny Kemble, and proprietor of the Great Slave Auction, grandson of the senator
Pierce Somerset Butler (1801–1865), Irish Member of Parliament in the United Kingdom House of Commons for Kilkenny, son of the previous MP
Pierce Butler (judge) (1866–1939), U.S. Supreme Court Justice
Pierce Butler (Irish politician, born 1922) (1922–1999), Irish Fine Gael Senator

See also
Lee Pierce Butler (1884–1953), American professor of librarian science